Patrick Foletti (born 27 May 1974) is a former Swiss goalkeeper who currently works as a goalkeeper coach for the Switzerland national football team.

Club career

Foletti started his professional career in his hometown at Mendrisio before moving to Grasshoppers, where he was mainly a substitute. During his tenure, he started 3 UEFA Champions League matches in 1995.

He moved to FC Schaffhausen in 1997 and later to FC Luzern in 1999, where he was a starter. In 2002, after a shortage of goalkeepers at Derby County, he was brought in on loan and appeared twice, first coming off the bench for the injured Andy Oakes in a 3–0 win vs Leicester City and playing the whole match in a 3–4 loss against Everton exactly one month later.

Foletti moved back to Switzerland in the following season, joining SC Kriens where he played until his retirement in 2007.

Coaching career

Foletti worked as a goalkeeper coach after his playing career was over. His first club was FC Luzern in 2007, then moving Grasshoppers the next year. He stayed in the club until 2011, when he was assigned the goalkeeping coach duty at Switzerland national team working both with senior and youth sides.

References

External links
Foletti Goalieschule (personal page)
Profile by FC Luzern fan site JustCantBeatThat.com  

1974 births
Living people
Association football goalkeepers
Expatriate footballers in England
Swiss expatriate footballers
Swiss expatriate sportspeople in England
Swiss men's footballers
Grasshopper Club Zürich players
Derby County F.C. players
Premier League players
FC Luzern players
Grasshopper Club Zürich non-playing staff
People from Mendrisio
Association football goalkeeping coaches
Sportspeople from Ticino